The Tonga national under-20 rugby union team competes in the IRB Junior World Championship since its inception in 2008. It replaced the former under 19 and 21 world championships. They have appeared in every competition since.

In 2014, the Tonga under-20 team was invited to compete at the Australian Under 20 Rugby Championship.

Squad
Squad to the 2015 World Rugby Under 20 Trophy:
Fangtua Taimikovi
Mesuilame Tufui
Tanginoa Halainoua
Puniani Malafu
Sosaia (Fine) Tokai
Siaosi Tonga
Patelesio Oneone - Vice Captain
Feliuaki Halaifonua
Tuihakavalu Ika
Taliauli Sikuea
Petelo Fatai
Semisi (Sitani) Tei
Sione Vailanu
Nikola Latuhoi
Ikapote Tupai
Filipine Vakapuna
Meimeite Siale
Alefosio Tatola
Timote Tai
Melino Samate
Johnathan Taliauli
Joseph Tongotea
Bill Fukofuka - Captain
Samson Fualalo
Mataiasi Fakautoki
Siaosi (George) Taina

Team Management 
Coach - Liueli Fusimalohi
Assistant Coach - Ofa Topeni
Manager - Antonino Latu
Team Doctor - Penisimani Poloniati
Strength & Conditioning Coach - Tavake Fangupo 
Physio - Mavae Otumuli

Previous Squads

Results

2008

2009

2010

2011

2012
Pool A
 11 - 22 
 62 - 7 
 41 - 14 
3rd Place
 31 - 29

References

External links
Tonga U-20 Squad list

Oceanian national under-20 rugby union teams
U